Pseudemoia spenceri, also known commonly as Spencer's widow-eyed skink or the trunk-climbing cool-skink, is a species of lizard in the family Scincidae. The species is endemic to Australia.

Etymology
The specific name, spenceri, is in honour of English-Australian biologist Walter Baldwin Spencer.

Geographic range
P. spenceri is found in southeastern Australia, in the Australian states of New South Wales and Victoria.

Habitat
The preferred natural habitats of P. spenceri are forest and rocky areas.

Reproduction
P. spenceri is viviparous.

References

Further reading
Cogger HG (2014). Reptiles and Amphibians of Australia, Seventh Edition. Clayton, Victoria, Australia: CSIRO Publishing. xxx + 1,033 pp. .
Kinghorn JR (1929). "A New Species of Lygosoma from New South Wales" Proceedings of the Linnean Society of New South Wales 54: 32–33. {Lygosoma (Liolepisma) weekesae, new species}.
Lucas AHS, Frost C (1894). "The Lizards indigenous to Victoria". Proceedings of the Royal Society of Australia, New Series 6: 24–92 + Plate II. {Lygosoma (Emoa) spenceri, new species, pp. 81–82 + Plate II, figures 1, 1a}.
Wilson S, Swan G (2013). A Complete Guide to Reptiles of Australia, Fourth Edition. Sydney: New Holland Publishers. 522 pp. .

Pseudemoia
Reptiles described in 1894
Skinks of Australia
Endemic fauna of Australia
Taxa named by Arthur Henry Shakespeare Lucas
Taxa named by Charles Frost (naturalist)